Prince Vasily Andreyevich Dolgorukov (1804–1868) was a Russian statesman, General of the Cavalry (1856, a full General equivalent), Minister of War (1852–1856), Chief of Gendarmes and Executive Head of the Third Section of H.I.M. Chancellery (1856–1866).

Honours and awards
 Order of St. Vladimir, 1st and 4th classes
 Order of St. Anna, 2nd class
 Order of St. Andrew

External links

1804 births
1868 deaths
Vasily Andreyevich
Chiefs of the Special Corps of Gendarmes
Members of the State Council (Russian Empire)
Recipients of the Order of St. Vladimir, 1st class
Recipients of the Order of St. Anna, 2nd class
Burials at Lazarevskoe Cemetery (Saint Petersburg)